Francis Lewis High School (FLHS) is a selective public high school located in Fresh Meadows, in the New York City borough of Queens. It is one of the most-applied-to public high schools in New York City with 9,468 applicants in 2016. Operated by the New York City Department of Education, the school serves students of grades 912. The school is named after Francis Lewis, who signed the United States Declaration of Independence as a representative of New York.

The school has several competitive and high-performing academic programs. Students are admitted to the school, either as zoned applicants from the surrounding area, or through these programs, whose acceptance rate are below 3% in the 2019 admissions statistics, some being as low as 1%.

The school has a 93% attendance rate, compared to 89% citywide. The school's graduation rate is 88% in four years, compared to 76% citywide. Of the graduating class, 82% of graduates enrolled in college or other post-secondary program within six months of graduation, compared to 59% citywide.

Student body 
Francis Lewis is one of the most selective and applied to public high schools in New York City. In March 2016, Francis Lewis had 9,468 applicants applying for a seat in the school. During the 2019–2020 school year, Francis Lewis had 4,418 students enrolled. For the 2019–2020 academic year, the student body was 56% Asian, 22% Hispanic, 16% Caucasian, and 6% African American. Ten percent of the students were learning English as a second language. Fourteen percent of the students had special needs.

Francis Lewis is also one of the most overcrowded; it has a capacity of 2,300, and the 2019–2020 enrollment figures exceeded that capacity by 176 percent. In 2019, the New York City School Construction Authority started constructing an annex with 500 seats and amenities such as a culinary arts room, a science lab, and a greenhouse. The annex is scheduled to be completed by September 2022.

The school has an alumni association for graduates.

Special programs and enrollment
Eighth and ninth graders applying to Francis Lewis can be admitted through its specialized academic programs which include the following.
 The Jacob K. Javits Law Institute for law studies. Students take semesters studying American law, analyzing the court system, and participating in mock trials and moot court. The program is a three-year program. The school's team won the New York City Moot Court Championships in December 1997. 
 The University Scholars Program, a program which gives its students an accelerated humanities program including Mythology for freshman year and Philosophy for sophomore year. Students are required to take AP English Language and Composition during junior year, and they have the choice of taking either Ancient Greek or AP English Literature and Composition during senior year. Students are required to take two foreign languages as well. The program is a four-year program.
 The Math and Science Research Program offers advanced studies of math, science and statistics. Students analyze scientific articles, write scientific papers, design and conduct experiments, and participate in science fairs. The program is a four-year program. The program has garnered various Siemens Competition and Intel Science Talent Search finalists and winners. For example, Francis Lewis had three semifinalists in 2010, more than any other high school in New York City.
 Math Team is a program that allows students to participate in citywide math competitions in addition to required math courses. In April 1999, the senior math team came in first place in the New York State Interscholastic Math Competition. In 2016, the program's math magazine received a gold medal from Columbia Scholastic Press Association, a Columbia University group.
 The Robotics and Engineering Program offers students education in engineering. Students learn how to construct and program their own robots and compete in citywide competitions. 
 The International Relations Program allows students to take an accelerated class in international relations including conflicts and trade. Students take field trips to the United Nations building to analyze relations between different country leaders.
 The Computer Science Program allows students to learn how to code on a computer and improve their programming skills.

In May 1995, the debate team won the New York City Championship in the annual Lincoln-Douglas debates for the first time in school history.

Before students enter sophomore year, Francis Lewis High School offers students the chance to switch into different programs. Several three-year programs become available, including the following:
The Dance Academy allows students to take a dance class in addition to the physical education class. Students learn how to do classical dances and modern dances. As of the 2018–2019 school year, students are able to audition to join the academy in their freshman year through orientation in June.
School of Design allows students classes to further their art skills.
The Graphic Design Academy allows students to pursue interests in graphic design.
The Journalism Academy offers students a classes to better understand news writing, reporting, and production. Students learn to produce a news story, learn to photojournalism skills, and broadcast and report through multimedia. The program has garnered multiple awards from the Newsies! Awards, run by Baruch College.
 The Sports and Medicine Academy teaches students necessary skills for working in the medical field. Students study human anatomy, medicines, and medical conditions.
The Music Program allows students to further their music skills with different types of instruments and through voice, taking any of the music electives for most of their high school tenure.
 The Virtual Enterprise International Academy allows students to learn the basis of designing and selling a product. Student learn marketing techniques, and they use these skills to try to sell a product to real investors. The program has garnered honors with top ranking companies in citywide competitions making nationals.

Academics
In order to give students high school credit and Regents credit, Francis Lewis offers numerous classes such as integrated algebra, geometry, trigonometry/algebra II, pre-trigonometry, English, living environment/biology, chemistry, physics, earth science, global history and geography, U.S. History and geography, U.S. government and economics, health, forensic science, sports medicine, literature, music appreciation, art, and graphic design.

As physical education classes, Francis Lewis High School offers frisbee, racket sports, soccer, basketball, yoga and dance, walking, weight training and conditioning, and volleyball.

The school offers music electives including chorus, concert choir, honors concert band, jazz ensemble, guitar, keyboard, marching band, and string orchestra. Students may take music electives for as long as their high school tenure. Music appreciation is offered as a one-year class for art/music credit.

Language studies 
In keeping with the school's diversity, Francis Lewis High School teaches several foreign languages, including Chinese (Mandarin), French, Greek (for the fourth year of the University Scholars program), Italian, Japanese, Korean, Latin, and Spanish. Classes for native speakers in Chinese, Korean, and Spanish are also available for students satisfying the NYCDOE's foreign language requirement. The school previously taught Arabic and Hebrew, but those classes ended due to declining interest.

English as New Language (ENL) is also available for English learners.

Advanced Placement courses 
In 1978, Francis Lewis High School was the first public high school to achieve certification to the International Baccalaureate, but stopped offering it in the 1990s. Advanced Placement (AP) courses are also available, offering college credit for work done during high school (based on the final test score).  Students may choose the full program to get a full years' college credit, or simply courses of interest (for credit towards single college courses such as math or humanities). Sixty-six percent of twelfth graders take at least one Advanced Placement exam at any time during high school; of these, 50% earned at least a 3 on at least one Advanced Placement exam.

Students may choose from 20 AP courses offered at Francis Lewis, including Biology, Calculus AB, Calculus BC, Capstone, Chemistry, Chinese Language and Culture, Computer Science A, English Language and Composition, English Literature and Composition, Environmental Science, Japanese Language and Culture, Latin, Macroeconomics, Microeconomics, Physics 1, Physics 2, AP Physics C: Mechanics, Psychology, Spanish, Statistics, United States Government and Politics, United States History, and World History.

Francis Lewis High School was ranked 29th out of the 520 public high schools in New York City, according to U.S. News & World Report.

College Now! courses 
Francis Lewis High School offers several courses from College Now, a program offered by the City University of New York to allow students access City University of New York classes and earn college credit. Classes are offered at Queens College and Queensborough Community College.

Students can choose up to six classes including astronomy, health and nutrition, criminal justice/sociology, computers in modern society, English, and pre-calculus.

Junior Reserve Officers' Training Corps
In 1994, the US Army Junior Reserve Officers' Training Corps (JROTC) program was established in the school. It is the largest in the nation, with more than 1,000 cadets of the 1,725 high school chapters in the country. The battalion is an honor unit with distinction, and it is considered one of the best and well-known US Army JROTC units in the nation. It had a 100% graduation rate from 1992 to 2013.

There are six JROTC teams, namely Academic, Choir, Drum Corps, Honor Guard, and Drill Team (Armed and Unarmed). Two teams compete, Academic and Drill Team (Unarmed – Patriot Pride, Armed – Patriot Guard). Francis Lewis High School used to have a competing Raiders team (female – Patriot Strength, male – Patriot Force). 

In 2018 allegations of hazing (involving sexual and physical assault) from the male Raiders team were made.

The Patriot Guard were national champions in 2007, 2009–2011, and placed second in 2012. The Patriot Pride came in second in 2006, 2008 and 2009 and first in 2010 and 2013 National Championships in Daytona, Florida.

The female Raiders were national champions for four consecutive years from 2009 to 2012. The male Raiders' most recent first-place title was in 2011, having come in third in the 2012 Nationals and second in the 2013 Nationals.

The Academic team was awarded first place at the 2015 Leadership Bowl Nationals. The Academic team placed as finalists in the JROTC Leadership Academic Bowl in 2011, 2012, and 2013.

In 2010, Francis Lewis had more cadets in the United States Military Academy than any other public high school in the United States.

The JROTC Program may be chosen as an elective that a student may have in addition to their program. Students enrolled in JROTC are required to partake in weekly physical training, conduct school and community service, wear the Army Service Uniform once a week, as well as take courses on leadership, nutrition, personal finance, civics, and government.

Extracurricular activities

Athletics 
Francis Lewis High School's athletic teams compete in the PSAL. Student-athletes compete in baseball, basketball, bowling, cheerleading, cross country, fencing, golf, handball, soccer, softball, swimming, tennis, track, volleyball, and wrestling

Francis Lewis High School's cross country team won the PSAL championship in 1968.

The school's soccer team won the PSAL championship in 1969.

The softball team won the PSAL championship in 1975.

Francis Lewis High School's girls basketball team won the PSAL Championship in March 1979. The team was undefeated in the regular season that year.

Francis Lewis has had a cricket team since 2015.

The school's male and female American handball team won the PSAL championship in the 2018–2019 season.

During the 1994–1995 season, Francis Lewis High School's boys basketball team was undefeated in its division, the first time it had done so since the 1980–1981 season. The team won the PSAL B Championship in March 1995. The team advanced to the New York State Federation Basketball Class A championship in Glens Falls. It lost to Mount Saint Michael Academy of the Bronx, knocking it out of the state tournament.

Francis Lewis High School's athletic field is named for Margaret Lambert, a German Jewish track and field athlete. During the 1930s, German athletic teams were closed to Jewish athletes, and the United States was considering to boycott the 1936 Summer Olympics in Berlin in protest of Germany's anti-Semitism. Adolf Hitler wanted to avoid a boycott, so he threatened her father to have her train for Germany in order to convince the world that Germany welcomed Jewish athletes to its team if they qualified. She tied the German high jump record at the national trials in Stuttgart, and she trained at the Olympic training camp in Ettlingen.

Clubs 
Francis Lewis offers a varying number of clubs approved by the Student Organization (SO). Students may fill out a club registration forms from the SO Office by the late September deadline.

The 2019–2020 school year offers clubs including 4H Cornell, American Red Cross Club, Anime Club, Art Club, Asian Food Culture Club, Baseball Club, Calligraphy Club, Chess Club, Chinese Chess Club, Chinese Club, Chinese Origami Club, Christian Seekers Fellowship, Creative Writing Club, Cultural Dance Club, Current Events Club, DECA, DIY Club, Double Up (mentor) Club, Dungeons and Dragons, Endangered Species Club, Environmental Club, Fashion Club, Film Club, Fitness Club, Food Club, Gardening Club, Girls Fall Conditioning, Girls Who Code (GWC), Glamour Gals, Green Team, Harry Potter Club, Hellenic Club, History Club, HS Investment Club (HSIC), Humans of Francis Lewis Magazine, Inspiring Inclusive Leaders, International Education Club, ISS Club, Japanese Club, Jewish Student Union, Journalism Club (FLHS News), Junior State of America (JSA), K-pop and Urban Dance Club (KUD), Key Club, Korean Club, Korean Drum Club, Kung Fu Club, LGBTQ+ Club, Math Club, Media Production Club, Medical Explorers Club, Mindfulness + Yoga Club, Model United Nations, Modern Music Club, Muslim Student Association Club, My Brother's Keeper, No Place for Hate, Nu Gamma Psi (male and female step teams), One Love Counseling Club, Programmers Initiative Club (PI), Public Speaking for Beginners, Puzzle Club, Science Olympiads, Sikh Student Association, Spanish Club, Students for Climate Action Now, Taekwondo Club, TED Talk Club, Teen Community Service (TCS), Travelers Club, Trivia Club, Ultimate Unity Dance Club, UNICEF, Video Game Club, Visual Arts Club, Women's Empowerment Club, and Workout Club.

Former clubs include 3D Model Club (2017–2018), ACLU (2017–2018) African American Club (2018–2019), Ancient History Club (2018–2019), Animal Humane Society (2017–2018), Astronomy Club (2016–2017), Big Sib-Little Sib (2017–2018), Books for Baddies (2018–2019), Bookworms (2017–2018), Caribbean Club (2017–2018), Comedy Club (2018–2019), Comic Book Club (2016–2017), Conscious Club (2018–2019), Conservation Club (2017–2018), Dancer Dynasty Club (2018–2019), Debate Club (2018–2019), eSport Club (2018–2019), Filipino Club, FLNBC (2015–2016), Food Appreciation Club (2017–2018), Game Club (2017–2018), Gamer's Connect (2018–2019), Game Development and Design Club (2018–2019), Glee Club (2015–2018), Global Advocates Club (2017–2019), Interconnected Club (2017–2018), International Club (2017–2018), International Pop Club (2017–2018), Latin Club (2017–2018), Latinos Unidos (2018–2019), Make-Up Club (2017–2018), Mental Health Club (2018–2019), Music Cover Club (2018–2019), Music Creation (2018–2019), One Neutron Extra (ONE, 2016–2017), Operation CARE Team (2017–2019), Philosophy Club (2018–2019), Photography Club, Pre-Med Club, Social Activist Club (2018–2019), SPEAK (2018–2019), STEMP Club (2018–2019), Video Game Club (2017–2018), and Youth Civic Engagement (YCE, 2018–2019).

History
In 1952, the Northeast Queens Council for Schools advocated for a northeast Queens high school because of severe overcrowding at Bayside High School, Flushing High School, Andrew Jackson High School, and Jamaica High School.

In December 1955, the New York City Board of Education approved the building of a new high school, called Northeast Queens High School, near the intersection of Utopia Parkway and 59th Avenue, with a capacity of 3,000 students. The city bought 11 acres of land, and the City Planning Commission agreed that the high school was needed, but the Commission did not approve the allocation of money to build the school in the capital budget.

In August 1956, the city approved the hiring of the firm of Eggers & Higgins to be the architect of the building, although the budget to actually build the high school was not yet approved.

In October 1956, Mayor Robert F. Wagner Jr. wrote a letter to the City Planning Commission asking it to include the construction of Northeast Queens High School in its capital budget. The construction was included in the capital budget in 1957.

In March 1958, the Board of Education approved a contract to build the high school. A $4,229,000 contract was awarded to the lowest bidder, Caristo Construction Company. The ground-breaking happened that same year. A group of parents tried to have an indoor swimming pool built in the high school, but they were not successful. The high school ended up costing $6,100,000 to build.

Francis Lewis High School opened on September 13, 1960. The school was named after Francis Lewis, a resident of Whitestone who signed the United States Declaration of Independence. Vincent McGarrett was the first principal. Herman Wolf was the first basketball coach. Queensborough Community College held some of its classes at Francis Lewis High School that year because its own campus was still under construction.

Francis Lewis High School was built for a capacity of 2,700 students. The school was overcrowded as of the 1962–1963 school year. Cardozo High School was built in 1967 in order to relieve overcrowding at Francis Lewis.

In 1965, Queensborough Community College held some of its evening classes at Francis Lewis High School due to overcrowding at Queensborough.

In 1978, Francis Lewis High School graduated International Baccalaureate diploma students, the first public high school in the United States to do so. It terminated in the 1990s.

In early 2018, Francis Lewis High School announced plans for a new annex to add more space and alleviate overcrowding. It would be located where a tennis court and the Margaret Lambert Track and Field House were. Construction began in 2019. Completion is expected by 2023.

Notable alumni
 Mashama Bailey - an American chef specializing in Southern cuisine, she is the chef at The Grey
 Steve Dorff (1968) – composer/music producer
 Rob Echeverria – American musician who has worked as the guitarist of Biohazard, Helmet, Rest in Pieces, and Straight Ahead.
 Rick Elice (1973) – actor, writer
 Steve Greenberg (1978) – record producer, former President of Columbia Records
 Sebastián Guenzatti –  soccer player for the Tampa Bay Rowdies of the United Soccer League
 Peter Guttman (1972) – travel journalist, lecturer, and author
 Heejun Han (2007) – finalist on American Idol, season 11
 Albie Hecht – former president of Nickelodeon, founder of Spike TV 
 Mike Jorgensen (1966) – drafted by the New York Mets; played for the New York Mets, Montreal Expos, Oakland Athletics, Texas Rangers, Atlanta Braves, and St. Louis Cardinals; managed the Cardinals
 Paul Joskow — American economist and professor
 Peter Marino – American architect
 Clair Marlo (1976) - aka Clara Veseliza - composer/music producer, known for her hit-song "'Til They Take My Heart Away", for her work as a record producer,  and for her exceptional body of work heard in Television, Film, and streaming worldwide.
 Peter Mehlman (1973) - a renowned writer, comedian, and television and film producer best known for his work on Seinfeld and Madagascar.
 Mark Miloscia – Washington State Senator 
 Jonathan Pontell –  television director, producer, and editor
 Craig Setari – American musician and former competitive boxer who is currently active as the bass player in Sick of It All – hardcore punk band
 Ron Shandler (1974) – national baseball analyst, author of Baseball Forecaster, founder of BaseballHQ.com, columnist for USA Today
 Dennis Walcott – former chancellor of the New York City Department of Education, president and CEO of the Queens Borough Public Library system
 Chris Welty (1981) – computer scientist

In fiction
 In The Yards, Joaquin Phoenix plays a character who graduated from Francis Lewis High School. The film's director, James Gray, grew up in Flushing.

References

External links

 
 At High School in Queens, R.O.T.C.’s Enduring Influence
 At School in Queens, Success Draws Crowd - New York Times
 National Drill Competition- Champions Interview- NBC

Public high schools in Queens, New York